Dockx is a surname. Notable people with the surname include:

Bart Dockx (born 1981), Belgian professional road bicycle racer
Daniel Martin Dockx (born 1974), Spanish Olympic dressage rider
Félix Dockx, Belgian cyclist
Gert Dockx (born 1988), Belgian professional road bicycle racer
Jean Dockx (1941–2002), Belgian international footballer

See also 
Dock